Dominic Kelly (23 June 1917 – 20 October 1982) was an English professional footballer who played as a centre half. His career was shortened by WW2. He was later a police officer and cricketer before being convicted of theft, embezzlement and manslaughter.

Early and personal life
Kelly was born in Sandbach, the younger brother of fellow footballer John Kelly. The two played together at Leeds United.

Career
Kelly played club football for Sandbach Ramblers, Leeds United and Newcastle United. His career was interrupted by World War II; he joined the Royal Corps of Signals, and played Army football. He retired after the end of World War II due to ligament damage exacerbated by his war service.

Later life and death
Upon his retirement from football in 1946 he joined the Newcastle upon Tyne City Police, During this time he played cricket and represented Northumberland. He was fired by the police in 1957 after being convicted of theft, and was later jailed for embezzlement in 1960. He moved to London and was convicted of manslaughter in 1969, serving five years in prison, having set fire to the hotel where he was working as a night porter, resulting in the death of a chambermaid. Kelly died on 20 October 1982 in Croydon.

References

1917 births
1982 deaths
English footballers
Leeds United F.C. players
Newcastle United F.C. players
English Football League players
Association football defenders
English cricketers
Northumberland cricketers
British police officers convicted of crimes
English people convicted of manslaughter
People convicted of embezzlement
British people convicted of theft
Sportspeople convicted of crimes 
20th-century English criminals
British Army personnel of World War II
Royal Corps of Signals soldiers